Andrew Ebbett (born January 2, 1983) is a Canadian former professional ice hockey centre. He currently serves as general manager of SC Bern.

Internationally, Ebbett has represented Team Canada at the 2016 and 2017 Spengler Cup, and won bronze at the 2018 Winter Olympics.

Playing career
Ebbett played collegiate hockey with the University of Michigan of the CCHA, captaining the Wolverines in his senior year. Undrafted, he was signed as a free agent by the Ottawa Senators on July 17, 2006. He then made his professional debut in the 2006–07 season with Ottawa's affiliate, the Binghamton Senators of the AHL.

The Anaheim Ducks signed Ebbett on May 16, 2007, assigning him to their affiliate, the Portland Pirates of the AHL. Ebbett made his NHL debut in the 2007–08 season with the Ducks, playing in 3 games. On June 11, 2008, the Ducks re-signed him to a two-year contract extension.

In the 2008–09 season, Ebbett began the year with affiliate, the Iowa Chops. After 28 games with the Chops, he was recalled and scored his first NHL goal against the Philadelphia Flyers on January 2, 2009, on his 26th birthday. Ebbett registered 32 points in only 48 games, helping the Ducks to the second round, when he scored his first Stanley Cup playoff goal in the upset of the San Jose Sharks on April 19, 2009.

Ebbett played 2 games with the Ducks in 2009–10 before the Chicago Blackhawks claimed him off waivers on October 17, 2009. Unable to find a role on the Blackhawks roster, Ebbett was waived after 10 games and acquired by the Minnesota Wild on November 21, 2009. He settled quickly, scoring a goal in his first game with the Wild against the Boston Bruins on November 25, 2009. Ebbett remained with Minnesota until the end of the season, posting 8 goals for 14 points in 49 games.

On July 2, 2010, Ebbett joined his fourth team in less than a year when he signed as a free agent to a one-year deal with the Phoenix Coyotes.

On July 1, 2011, he signed a one-year contract worth $525,000 with the Vancouver Canucks.

On July 2, 2012, Ebbett signed a one-year, two-way contract with the Vancouver Canucks that paid him $600,000 at the NHL level and $300,000 at the AHL level.

On July 5, 2013, Ebbett signed a two-year, two-way contract with the Pittsburgh Penguins that paid him $1.1 million at the NHL level.

As an impending free agent following the 2014–15 season with the Penguins, Ebbett signed his first contract abroad in agreeing to a two-year contract with Swiss club, SC Bern of the National League A (NLA) on June 24, 2015. He helped Bern win the 2016 Swiss championship, scoring five goals and ten assists in 14 playoff contests. In the regular season, he had seen the ice 19 times with four goals and nine assists. In October 2015, Ebbett fractured his tibial plateau and was sidelined for three months. In December 2016, he won the Spengler Cup with Team Canada and was named to the tournament's all-star team. In January 2017, he signed a contract extension with Bern that would keep him with the team until 2019. In the 2016–17 season, he won his second Swiss Championship with Bern. On January 3, 2019, he was signed to an early two-year contract extension by SC Bern through the 2020–21 season. During the 2018–19 season, Ebbett won his third Swiss Championship in four years, posting 11 points in 18 post-season games. On March 18, 2020, Ebbett was released by SC Bern, despite a valid contract for the 2020–21 season.

On February 8, 2021, Ebbett returned to the professional circuit after belatedly signing a contract for the remainder of the 2020–21 season with German club, EHC München of the DEL. He officially retired from professional hockey at the end of the season.

Executive career
On May 26, 2021, Ebbett was named the general manager of former club, SC Bern of the NL.

International play

Ebbett was first selected to represent Team Canada at the 2016 and 2017 Spengler Cup.

During the 2017–18 season, Ebbett was selected to represent Canada at the 2018 Winter Olympics in Pyeongchang, South Korea. Later announced as an alternate captain, Ebbett recorded three points in five games to help Canada win bronze.

Career statistics

Regular season and playoffs

International

Awards and honours

References

External links
 

1983 births
Anaheim Ducks players
SC Bern players
Binghamton Senators players
Canadian ice hockey centres
Chicago Blackhawks players
Chicago Wolves players
Ice hockey people from British Columbia
Iowa Stars players
Living people
Michigan Wolverines men's ice hockey players
Minnesota Wild players
Sportspeople from Vernon, British Columbia
Olympic ice hockey players of Canada
Ice hockey players at the 2018 Winter Olympics
Olympic bronze medalists for Canada
Medalists at the 2018 Winter Olympics
Olympic medalists in ice hockey
Canadian expatriate ice hockey players in Switzerland
Phoenix Coyotes players
Pittsburgh Penguins players
Portland Pirates players
San Antonio Rampage players
Undrafted National Hockey League players
Vancouver Canucks players
Wilkes-Barre/Scranton Penguins players